The 2019–20 BTravel WABA League was the 19th season of the Adriatic League. Competition included eight teams from six countries. In this season, participating clubs from Serbia, Croatia, Montenegro, Bosnia and Herzegovina, Bulgaria and Slovenia.

Teams

Team allocation

Venues and locations

Regular season

In the Regular season was played with 10 teams and play a dual circuit system, each with each one game at home and away. The four best teams at the end of the regular season were placed in the Final Four. The regular season began on 2 October 2019 and it will end on 4 March 2020.

Standings

Final Four

Final Four which was to be played from 21 to 22 March 2020 in the Stara Zagora, Bulgaria, but it was canceled due to the spread of COVID-19. The final standings were announced on the basis of the Regular season.

Awards
Player of the Year: Andreona Keys (178-G-95) of  Cinkarna Celje
Guard of the Year: Nikolina Babić (177-G-95) of  Budućnost Bemax
Forward of Year: Andreona Keys (178-G-95) of  Cinkarna Celje
Center of the Year: Dimana Georgieva (188-F/C-88) of  Montana 2003
Newcomer of the Year: Maša Janković (187-C-00) of  Crvena zvezda
Most Improved Player of Year: Josipa Pavić (189-C-99) of  Trešnjevka 2009
Defensive Player of Year: Shakyla Hill (170-G-96) of  Kraljevo
Coach of the Year: Vladan Radović of  Budućnost Bemax

1st Team
G: Shakyla Hill (170-G-96) of  Kraljevo
G: Nikolina Babić (177-G-95) of  Budućnost Bemax
G: Andreona Keys (178-G-95) of  Cinkarna Celje
F/C: Dimana Georgieva (188-F/C-88) of  Montana 2003
C: Adijat Adams (188-C-92) of  Beroe

2nd Team
PG: Ivana Katanić (180-PG-99) of  Crvena zvezda
SG: Snežana Bogićević (177-SG-97) of  Cinkarna Celje
G/F: Teodora Dineva (178-G/F-96) of  Beroe
C: Tina Trebec (190-C-90) of  Montana 2003
F/C: Nikolina Džebo (186-F/C-95) of  Budućnost Bemax

Honorable Mention
Taeler Deer (165-G-96) of  Cinkarna Celje
Matea Tavić (178-G-92) of  Montana 2003
Jaklin Zlatanova (190-PF-88) of  Beroe
Chelsey Lee (193-C-89) of  Beroe
Aleksandra Račić (181-G-90) of  Kraljevo
Dragana Gobeljic (181-F-88) of  Kraljevo
Jovana Marković (186-PF-97) of  RMU Banovići
Tamara Rajić (182-G/F-93) of  Orlovi
Josipa Pavić (189-C-99) of  Trešnjevka 2009

All-Defensive Team
G: Shakyla Hill (170-G-96) of  Kraljevo
PG: Ivana Katanić (180-PG-99) of  Crvena zvezda
G/F: Teodora Dineva (178-G/F-96) of  Beroe
F/C: Dimana Georgieva (188-F/C-88) of  Montana 2003
C: Adijat Adams (188-C-92) of  Beroe

All-Newcomers Team
PG: Anđela Gligić (157-PG-00) of  Orlovi
G: Milica Zeljković (176-G-98) of  RMU Banovići
C: Maša Janković (187-C-00) of  Crvena zvezda
F: Gorana Marjanović (188-F-00) of  Partizan 1953
C: Josipa Jurić (196-C-01) of  Trešnjevka 2009

See also
 2019–20 ABA League First Division
 2019–20 First Women's Basketball League of Serbia

References

External links
 Official website
 Profile at eurobasket.com

 
2019-20
2019–20 in European women's basketball leagues
2019–20 in Serbian basketball
2019–20 in Bosnia and Herzegovina basketball
2019–20 in Croatian basketball
2019–20 in Montenegrin basketball
2019–20 in Slovenian basketball
2019–20 in Bulgarian basketball